The list of Left Communist organisations in the Weimar Republic includes groups and organisations associated with left communism. Some of them are groups of the left-wing opposition of the Communist Party of Germany (KPD) who opposed the course of KPD leadership  both within and without the party, especially against the Stalinization. They formed party factions in the KPD, were excluded or broke away to form independent groups.

References 

Defunct communist parties in Germany
Defunct socialist parties in Germany
Left communist organizations
Political parties in the Weimar Republic
Politics of the Weimar Republic
Weimar Republic